As of 2018, Wolters Kluwer ranks as the Dutch biggest publisher of books in terms of revenue. Other notable Dutch houses include Brill (est. 1683) and Elsevier (est. 1880).

History

Printed books first appeared in the 1470s in places such as Delft, Deventer, Gouda, Nijmegen, Utrecht, Zwolle, and in the 1480s in places such as Haarlem, Leiden, and 's-Hertogenbosch.

Among Dutch bestsellers are titles such as the 17th-century Lusthof des Gemoets by Jan Philipsz Schabaelje.

The Stichting Drukwerk in de Marge formed in 1975, and organizes an annual Boekkunstbeurs (book fair). Bibliophiles in 1991 organized the Nederlands Genootschap van Bibliofielen.

The United Nations Educational, Scientific and Cultural Organization named Amsterdam the 2008 World Book Capital.

Collections

The Leiden University Library began in 1575, and the Koninklijke Bibliotheek (royal library) in The Hague in 1798. Since 1919, the Nederlandse Centrale Catalogus lists titles in Dutch libraries.

See also
 National Library of the Netherlands
 Media of the Netherlands
 Dutch-language literature
 Digital Library for Dutch Literature

References

This article incorporates information from the Dutch Wikipedia.

Bibliography

in English

in Dutch
 
  1984-
  1992-
  1994-

External links

  (About history of the printed book in the Netherlands). Index
  (Bibliography)
 
 
 Depot van Nederlandse Publicaties (voluntary national deposit)
  (Assorted artworks depicting people with books)
 

Netherlands
Mass media in the Netherlands
Book publishing in the Netherlands
 
Libraries in the Netherlands